Protolabs is a company that provides rapid manufacturing of low-volume 3D printed, CNC-machined, sheet metal, and injection-molded custom parts for prototyping and short-run production. Markets like medical devices, electronics, appliances, automotive and consumer products use these parts. Protolabs' headquarters and manufacturing facilities are located in Maple Plain, Minnesota. The company also has manufacturing facilities in England, Germany, and Japan.

History

Protomold

In 1999, Larry Lukis founded the Protomold Company, Inc., that specialized in the quick-turn manufacture of custom plastic injection molded parts. Protomold was recognized for its small batch molded parts and rush orders. He previously ran ColorSpan, an original equipment manufacturer that produces printers and desktop publishing systems. He was the chief technology officer of Protomold. Later, in 2001, Brad Cleveland joined Protomold as CEO and president.

In 2005, Protomold opened up its first UK plant in Telford, England. Two years later, Protomold introduced the Firstcut quick-turn CNC machining service.

Protolabs

In 2009, the company combined its Protomold and Firstcut services under its corporate name, Proto Labs Inc., known colloquially and in official messaging as Protolabs. 

In 2009, Protolabs opened a location in Japan to serve Japanese design engineers. In the same year, Firstcut, a service from Protolabs, made available CNC-machined prototype parts made of aluminum, as well as ABS, nylon, and PEEK. 

In February 2012, Protolabs completed its initial public offering of common stock.

In 2013, Protolabs reached $150 million in revenue. In 2014, Protolabs acquired the North Carolina-based 3-D printing company, FineLine Prototyping Inc. In fall 2016, Protolabs' 3D printing services moved to a new 77,000 sq. ft. facility in Cary, North Carolina. The company also opened a plant in Plymouth, Minnesota.

In February 2014, Vicki Holt was named CEO. She was hired to help Protolabs become a billion dollar manufacturing company. Holt is expanding Protolabs into the medical equipment markets and the lighting industry.

In November 2017, Protolabs acquired RAPID Manufacturing in Nashua, New Hampshire for an aggregate purchase price of $120 million to expand into sheet metal fabrication capabilities.

COVID-19 Pandemic

During the 2019–2020 coronavirus pandemic, Protolabs began producing face shields, plastic clips, and components for coronavirus test kits for use in Minnesota hospitals. The company also collaborated with the University of Minnesota to produce parts for a low-cost ventilator.

2021

In January 2021, Protolabs announced an agreement to acquire Amsterdam-based manufacturing platform 3D Hubs for $280 million in cash and stock plus incentives.

In March 2021, Holt plans to retire and will be succeeded as CEO by VP and GM of Americas, Robert Bodor, according to a company announcement.

Cool Idea! Program
In 2011, Protolabs launched the Cool Idea! Award program. The program awards a total of up to $250,000 each year in services to entrepreneurs with innovative product ideas in the United States and Europe.

Awards
 In 2004, the Minneapolis/St Paul Business Journal named Protomold to the top of its “Growth 50” list.
 In 2010 and 2013, Protolabs was awarded the Queen's Awards for Enterprise.
 In June 2012, Larry Lukis and Brad Cleveland won the Ernst & Young Entrepreneur of the Year Award for their work with Protolabs.
 In 2013 and 2014, Protolabs was recognized by Forbes in the top 5 of America's Best Small Companies.
 In 2015, Protolabs was recognized as one of the top-ranked rapid prototyping vendors in the United States by their customers.
 In 2016, Workplace Dynamics recognized Protolabs as a top-ranked workplace in Minnesota 
 In 2016, the Minnesota High Tech Association awarded Protolabs (alongside Recombinetics, Sentera, and 12 other companies) with a Tekne award for its work in advanced manufacturing.

See also

References

Further reading 
 Injection Molding: New Twists for a Mainstream Technology
 "How Proto Labs Is Building The Factory Of The Future", Forbes

External links
 Official site

Companies listed on the New York Stock Exchange
Manufacturing companies established in 1999
Manufacturing companies based in Minnesota
1999 establishments in Minnesota
American companies established in 1999
2012 initial public offerings
Injection molding
3D printing
Numerical control
Fused filament fabrication